The 1899 Chicago Physicians and Surgeons football team was an American football team that represented the College of Physicians and Surgeons of Chicago  in the 1899 college football season.  The Surgeons compiled a 4–1 record, and outscored their opponents 112 to 12.  This would be the last winning season in the college's history, as they would amass an abysmal 1–24 record over the next eight seasons until their disbandment in 1908.

Schedule

References

Chicago Physicians and Surgeons
Chicago Physicians and Surgeons football seasons
Chicago Physicians and Surgeons football team